Spyrydon Lytvynovych (6 December 1810 – 4 June 1869) was the Metropolitan Archbishop of the Ukrainian Greek Catholic Church from 1864 until his death in 1869.

Life
Spyrydon Lytvynovych was born on 6 December 1810 in Nadrichne, in Austrian Galicia (present-day in Ternopil Raion, Ternopil Oblast, Ukraine). He graduated of philosophy and theology at the University of Lviv. He was ordained priest on 19 July 1835 and returned to Galicia where he served as preached and teacher of religion. In February 1848 he was appointed as Greek Catholic pastor of the St. Barbara parish in Wien. Soon after he was appointed honorary Canon, and in 1852 he became the first rector of the newly established Greek Catholic seminary.

In March 1857 he was appointed auxiliary bishop of the Ukrainian Catholic Archeparchy of Lviv and consecrated Bishop in Wien by retired Romanian Greek-Catholic Archbishop Ioan Lemeni on 17 May 1857.

At the death of Cardinal Mykhajlo Levitsky in 1858 he was appointed Administrator of the Archeparchy. In 1861 he was elected Deputy Speaker of the Parliament of Galicia. Since 1861 he was a member of the Austrian State Council of which he became Vice President in 1861.

After the death of Metropolitan Hryhory Yakhymovych, on 30 June 1863 Spyrydon Lytvynovych was designed Metropolitan of Lviv by Emperor Franz Joseph I of Austria and so confirmed by Pope Pius IX on 28 September 1863. The enthronement occurred on 5 May 1864. He led and obtained the canonization of Saint Josaphat Kuntsevych in 1867. Spyrydon Lytvynovych died on 4 June 1869 in Lviv.

Notes

1810 births
1869 deaths
People from Ternopil Oblast
People from the Kingdom of Galicia and Lodomeria
Members of the Austrian House of Deputies (1861–1867)
Members of the House of Lords (Austria)
Members of the Diet of Galicia and Lodomeria
Ukrainian politicians before 1991
Higher Scientific Institute for Diocesan Priests at St. Augustine's alumni
Metropolitans of Galicia (1808-2005)